Group 14 hydrides are chemical compounds composed of hydrogen atoms and group 14 atoms (the elements of group 14 are carbon, silicon, germanium, tin, lead and flerovium).

Tetrahydrides
The tetrahydride series has the chemical formula XH4, with X representing any of the carbon family. Methane is commonly the result of the decomposition of organic matter and is a greenhouse gas. The other hydrides are generally unstable, poisonous metal hydrides.

They take on a pyramidal structure, and as such are not polar molecules like the other p-block hydrides.

Unlike other light hydrides such as ammonia, water and hydrogen fluoride, methane does not exhibit any anomalous effects attributed to hydrogen bonding, and so its properties conform well to the prevailing trend of heavier group 14 hydrides.

Hexahydrides
This series has the chemical formula X2H6. Ethane is commonly found alongside methane in natural gas. The other hydrides are even less stable than the tetrahydrides.

Higher group 14 hydrides 
All straight-chain saturated group 14 hydrides follow the formula XnH2n+2, the same formula for the alkanes.

Many other group 14 hydrides are known. Carbon forms a huge variety of hydrocarbons (with propane and butane following methane and ethane among the alkanes, but also including alkenes, alkynes, cyclic and branched compounds, as well as aromatic hydrocarbons such as benzene, toluene and limonene), whose study forms the core of organic chemistry. 

Alongside hydrogen, carbon can form compounds with the chemically similar halogens, forming haloalkanes. The simplest of this series, the halomethanes, contain compounds such as dichloromethane and iodoform. Other such important chemicals include vinyl chloride, which is used in the production of PVC.

The other group 14 elements have a lower tendency to catenate. Silanes SinH2n+2 are known for n = 1–8 (thermal stability decreasing as n increases), as are cyclosilanes Si5H10 and Si6H12. They are very reactive, pyrophoric colourless gases or volatile liquids. Their volatility is intermediate between the alkanes and the germanes. Unsaturated silanes, the silenes and silynes, have been characterized spectroscopically.  The first members of each respectively are disilene and disilyne, the silicon analogues of ethylene and acetylene. The first five germanes GenH2n+2 are known and are fairly similar to the silanes. Stannane, a strong reducing agent slowly decomposes at room temperature to tin and hydrogen gas, and is decomposed by concentrated aqueous acids or alkalis; distannane, Sn2H6 is still more unstable, and longer stannanes are unknown. Plumbane is very poorly characterised and is only known in trace amounts: even at low temperatures, synthesis methods that yield the other MH4 compounds fail to give PbH4. No other plumbanes are known.

Compounds containing hydrogen and multiple group 14 elements are known, one of the most famous of these being tetraethyllead.

See also
Group 14 hydrides radical:
Methylene
Methylidyne

Titanium(IV) hydride, a structural analog of the group 14 tetrahydrides

References

Bibliography

Hydrides
Hydrogen compounds